Thomas Victor Perry (1908-1989) was Dean of Clonmacnoise from 1961 until 1979.

Perry was educated at Trinity College, Dublin.  He served at Carlow, Bolarum, Calicut and Madras; and, during World War II as a Chaplain to the Forces. When peace returned he served incumbencies in Kilmallock, Kilmessan and Trim  before his time as Dean.

References

1908 births
1989 deaths
Alumni of Trinity College Dublin
Deans of Clonmacnoise
20th-century Irish Anglican priests